Essays in Self-criticism is one of the chief works of the Marxist philosopher Louis Althusser, first published in 1974. An English translation by Grahame Lock was published in 1976.

References

Bibliography
Books

 
 

1968 non-fiction books
French non-fiction books
Philosophy books
Works by Louis Althusser